Donald Stuart (‘Don’) Miller (born 23 July 1936) is a British engineer and author of the industry standard ‘Internal Flow Systems’ text book.

Career 

Miller received his school education in England before joining the Royal Air Force (RAF) in the early 1950s as a teenage recruit to serve a three-year apprenticeship as an Aero Engine Fitter. After 10 years in the RAF he began working for Bristol Siddeley Aero Engines on engine defect investigation. He then studied for a M.Sc. in aeronautical engineering before joining the British Hydromechanics Research Association (BHRA) in 1965. While at BHRA, Miller was involved in many aspects of flow systems from physical model studies to extensive research projects investigating specific flow problems, such as noise, cavitation and fluid transients. He became Group Head, Industrial Fluid Mechanics and then Research Director which he held up to his retirement in 1997.

During his three decades at BHRA, Miller engaged in research and development programs undertaken with the objective of improving the design of fluid systems. He applied his knowledge to the design of fluid related equipment and to troubleshooting fluid systems on process and power plants. His research included extensive studies to provide pressure loss coefficient data for large flow systems including interactions between fluid system components. His work also extended into studies of fluid transients in pipeline systems. In analyzing pressure loss coefficient data from hundreds of sources Miller determined that to maximize the value of the published data it needed to be classified as to its reliability and suitability for engineering design. The result of his work was the classification system he used in Part Two of ‘Internal Flow Systems’. Loss coefficient data included in his book were verified, as far as possible, against experiments at BHRA and/or the work of a number of groups around the world that had contributed experimental results over an extended period.

Publications 
Miller's BHRA pressure loss data was coupled with extensive information extracted from the open literature to write the definitive reference book ‘Internal Flow Systems’ first published in 1978. This was followed by a second edition in 1986 when Miller revised some of the loss coefficient information in the light of new data becoming available and comments from readers. By 1982, the ‘Internal Flow Systems’ textbook data had found a new application with its correlations becoming the underlying data for the first generation of the commercial 1D thermo-fluid system simulation software, Flowmaster™.

After retiring in the 1990s Miller has continued to innovate and has specialized in micro abrasive waterjets for precision machining in collaboration with Finepart Sweden AB. He subsequently released an e-Book in 2015 that was both a commentary and sister publication to ‘Internal Flow Systems’ which he called ‘Confidence in Fluid System Design’.

Internal Flow Systems is a well-cited reference text.

References

External links 
 BHR Group
 Donald Stuart Miller Blog
 YouTube Interview with D.S. Miller, 2017

1936 births
Living people
British civil engineers